Arnex may refer to:

Arnex-sur-Nyon, Vaud, Switzerland
Arnex-sur-Orbe, Vaud, Switzerland